Mount Pawson is a mountain 7 nautical miles (13 km) southeast of Mohn Peaks, on the east coast of Palmer Land. First mapped by the Falkland Islands Dependencies Survey (FIDS)-RARE joint sledge party of 1947–48. Remapped by United States Geological Survey (USGS) from surveys and U.S. Navy air photos, 1961–67. Named by Advisory Committee on Antarctic Names (US-ACAN) for David L. Pawson, biologist with the Palmer Station-Eastwind Expedition, summer 1965–66.

Mountains of Palmer Land